The 2003 Little League World Series took place between August 15 and August 24 in South Williamsport, Pennsylvania. The Musashi-Fuchu Little League of Tokyo, Japan, defeated the East Boynton Beach Little League of Boynton Beach, Florida, in the championship game of the 57th Little League World Series.

Notable players
The following LLWS players later appeared in Major League Baseball (MLB):

Teams

Between five and twelve quailcation take part in 16 regional qualification tournaments, which vary in format depending on region. In the United States, the qualification tournaments are in the same format as the Little League World Series itself: a round-robin tournament followed by an elimination round to determine the regional champion.

Pool play
The top two teams in each pool move on to their respective semifinals. The winners of each met on August 24 to play for the Little League world championship.

August 15

August 16

August 17

August 18

August 19

International

August 15

August 16

August 17

August 18

August 19

Elimination rounds

References

Notes
† Postponed (rained out)
‡ Game ended by "mercy rule" (at least 10-run difference through 5 innings)

External links
2003 official results via Wayback Machine
Recap of championship game via Wayback Machine

Little League World Series
Little League World Series
Little League World Series